Georgios Kyriopoulos (Greek: Γεώργιος Κυριόπουλος; born 24 August 2003) is a Greek professional footballer who plays as a winger for Super League 2 club Panathinaikos B.

References

2004 births
Living people
Greece youth international footballers
Super League Greece 2 players
Panathinaikos F.C. players
People from Kos
Greek footballers
Panathinaikos F.C. B players
Sportspeople from the South Aegean